Dmitry Vladimirovich Venevitinov (– ) was a minor Russian Romantic poet who died (perhaps committed suicide) at the age of 21, carrying with him one of the greatest hopes of Russian literature. He was one of the Russian Schellingians.

Biography
Of noble parentage, Venevitinov entered the Moscow University in 1824. He became a member of the circle of "wisdom-lovers" (Lyubomudry), led by Prince Vladimir Odoevsky. Venevitinov and his friends were the young Idealists who introduced into Russia the cult of Goethe and Schelling's metaphysics.

Venevitinov's poems (of which there are forty) dwell on philosophical subjects. According to D.S. Mirsky, "his diction is very pure, and his rhythms pure and majestic". In one of his better known poems, Venevitinov vainly pleaded Pushkin to address an ode to Goethe.

Venevitinov's early death was lamented by a number of Russian poets and critics. His line "Kak znal on zhizn'! kak malo zhil!" (How well he knew life! how little he did live!) was carved on his tomb at the Simonov Monastery. The Soviets had his remains moved to the Novodevichy Cemetery.

References

Sources
 
 
 Leighton, Lauren Gray, ed. (1987) Russian Romantic Criticism: An Anthology, Westport: Greenwood Publishing Group.

External links
 

Russian male poets
Writers from Moscow
Moscow State University alumni
Burials at Novodevichy Cemetery
1805 births
1827 deaths
19th-century poets from the Russian Empire
19th-century male writers from the Russian Empire